Eight Miles High (original title: Das wilde Leben, lit. The Wild Life) is a 2007 German biographical motion picture, set in the 1960s and depicting the "wild life" of Uschi Obermaier, a West German sex symbol and icon of the era.

Film Synopsis 

Obermaier enjoyed sexual freedom at the legendary Kommune 1 in Berlin after being with the krautrock band  Bröselpilze. In the Kommune, she becomes friendly with Rainer Langhans. The young woman from Munich gains employment as a model, and becomes a sex symbol and youth icon. Now a cover girl in Playboy magazine, she meets rock stars such as Mick Jagger and Keith Richards, while Italian film producer, Carlo Ponti, offers her a ten-year contract, but she declines: her freedom is more important than a contract.

During her intensive relationship with Keith Richards, she begins to recognize the dark side of the shiny glamour world she lives in: the isolation of the stars, and the groupie-populated milieux of anonymous hotel rooms — this is not her idea of life.

She finds new freedom in a relationship with the adventurer Dieter Bockhorn (David Scheller). They fall in love and go on a six-year road trip around the world. Later, Bockhorn dies in a motorcycle accident in Mexico.

Cast 
Natalia Avelon as Uschi Obermaier
Matthias Schweighöfer as Rainer Langhans
Victor Norén (singer of the Swedish band Sugarplum Fairy) as Mick Jagger 
Alexander Scheer as Keith Richards 
David Scheller as Dieter Bockhorn.
Urs Rechn as "the knocker" Norbert Grupe

Production crew
Directed by Achim Bornhak.
Written by Achim Bornhak and Olaf Kraemer.
Based on a work by C. P. Hant, Dagmar Benke and Olaf Kraemer

Filming locations 
Berlin, Hamburg, Munich, and Bavaria in Germany
Goa, Jaipur, and Rajasthan in India

Soundtrack 

Ville Valo and Natalia Avelon recorded a cover version of the Nancy Sinatra/Lee Hazlewood song Summer Wine for the soundtrack. A music video was also shot, featuring Valo and Avelon with the real Uschi Obermaier.

External links 
Official Movie Website
 
 

2007 films
2007 biographical drama films
2000s feminist films
2000s German-language films
Cultural depictions of models
Cultural depictions of German women
Cultural depictions of the Rolling Stones
Films about groupies
Films directed by Achim Bornhak
Films set in the 1960s
Films set in India
Films set in West Germany
German biographical drama films
German rock music films
Hippie films
Musical films based on actual events
Warner Bros. films
2000s German films